A Woman's Devotion  is a 1956 American film noir directed by Paul Henreid and starring Ralph Meeker, Janice Rule and Paul Henreid.

Plot
Artist Trevor Stevenson (Meeker), an emotionally scarred World War II veteran, is on honeymoon in Acapulco with his bride Stella (Rule). Shortly after their arrival, two women are murdered. The audience is presented with clues pointing to Trevor's guilt or innocence depending upon one's point of view.

Cast
 Ralph Meeker as Trevor Stevenson  
 Janice Rule as Stella Stevenson  
 Paul Henreid as Capt. Henrique Monteros  
 Rosenda Monteros as María  
 Fanny Schiller as Señora Reidl  
 José Torvay as Gómez  
 Yerye Beirute as Amigo Herrera  
 Tony Carbajal as Sergeant  
 Jaime González Quiñones as Roberto  
 Carlos Riquelme as Chief of police

Production
The film was originally known as Acapulco. Henreid says he got Franz Waxman to score the picture but Herbert Yates of Republic overruled him.

Reception
Henreid later claimed the film was "absolutely ruined" by the studio. "It was a decent film, not a great film by any means... apparently they didn't understand the film at all and they cut essential parts."

See also
List of American films of 1956

References

External links
 
 
 
 

1956 films
1956 crime drama films
American crime drama films
Film noir
Films set in Mexico
Films shot in Mexico
Color film noir
Republic Pictures films
Films scored by Les Baxter
1950s English-language films
1950s American films